Microshift is the third studio album, fourth long play record and final album by British rock band Hookworms. It was released on 2 February 2018 by Domino Recording Company. The album's namesake is an audio plug-in. The record is dedicated to "Archie", the band's former live sound engineer.

The album was included in the book 1001 Albums You Must Hear Before You Die.

Critical reception

Microshift received favourable reviews on release. At Metacritic, which assigns a normalised rating out of 100 to reviews from mainstream critics, the album received an average score of 87, based on 18 reviews, indicating universal acclaim.

Track listing
Tracks 1–5 and 7–9 were written by Hookworms with lyrics by MJ. Track 6 was written by Alice Merida Richards and Hookworms.

Personnel
Hookworms
 EO – guitars, backing vocals, additional percussion
 JN – drums, percussion
 JW – guitars
 MB – bass, modular synthesizer, synthesizers
 MJ – lyrics, vocals, backing vocals, keyboards, synthesizers, producing, recording, mixing

Additional personnel
 Alice Mérida Richards – additional vocals and lyrics ; backing vocals – 
 Christopher Duffin – tenor and soprano saxophone on 
 Richard Formby – additional Modular Synthesizer 
 Published by Domino Publishing Co. Ltd
 Recorded by MJ at Suburban Home Studio, Leeds
 Mixed by MJ at Suburban Home Studio, Leeds
 Mastered by Tom Woodhead at Hippocratic Mastering
 Artwork by Louis Byrne

Charts

References

2018 albums
Hookworms (band) albums
Domino Recording Company albums